Barry County is the name of two counties in the United States, both named for U.S. Postmaster General William T. Barry:

 Barry County, Michigan 
 Barry County, Missouri